Dayella may refer to:

A fabric once manufactured by the makers of Viyella
Dayella (fish), a genus of fish in the family Clupeidae